Eric Benét Jordan (born October 15, 1967) is an American R&B/neo soul singer-songwriter and actor, who has received a total of four Grammy nominations to date for his musical work.

Biography

Early life 
Benét was born on October 15, 1967 in Mobile, Alabama and raised in Milwaukee, Wisconsin. He is the youngest of five siblings.

Career 
Benét sang with a Top 100-style group called Gerard in the late 1980s. Benét, his sister Lisa, and his cousin George Nash Jr. formed a band called Benét and released a self-titled album in 1992, and it went on to sell over 100,000 copies. Two years later, Eric Benét broke onto the music scene with his solo career and signed with Warner Bros. Records, releasing his debut solo album, True to Myself in 1996. His second album, A Day in the Life, was released in 1999 and featured his smash hit "Spend My Life With You (featuring Tamia)". The song rose to No. 1 on the US Billboard R&B charts (for 3 weeks), was certified gold, and nominated for a 2000 Grammy Award for "Best R&B Performance by a Duo or Group". The album also won a Soul Train Music Award for "Best R&B/Soul Album, Male".

Benét's career, however, was interrupted by a series of personal tragedies. His father died of cancer. In addition, his girlfriend, Tami Marie Stauff, died on April 24, 1993, from injuries suffered in an automobile accident, leaving Eric a single father to their one-year-old daughter, India (born December 4, 1991).

In 1994, Benét signed with Warner Bros. Records, releasing his solo debut album, True to Myself in 1996.  Individual songs from the album were successful, including the top-ten R&B hits "Spiritual Thang", "Femininity" and "Let's Stay Together", which originally appeared on the soundtrack of the film A Thin Line Between Love and Hate.

In between albums, Eric collaborated with his then-labelmates Somethin' for the People on their 1997 album This Time It's Personal singing leads on the single "Act Like You Want It". His next album, A Day in the Life, was released in 1999.  Its first single, "Georgy Porgy (featuring Faith Evans)" received significant airplay, but the second single, "Spend My Life With You (featuring Tamia)", became a smash hit. "Spend My Life With You" rose to number one on the American R&B charts, was certified gold, and nominated for a 2000 Grammy Award for Best R&B Performance by a Duo or Group. The album, A Day in the Life also won a Soul Train Music Award for Best R&B/Soul Album, Male.

Benét also recorded for Earth, Wind, and Fire's 30th anniversary CD. He contributed vocals to the post-Katrina charity single, "Heart of America", along with Michael McDonald, Wynonna Judd, and Terry Dexter. He has also lent his vocals to many jazz albums for such artists as Wayman Tisdale, George Duke, Chris Botti, Jeff Lorber, and Boney James.

Benét recorded his following album Better and Better in 2001, but Warner Bros. rejected to release this album and forced him to stay in the R&B genre. Due to the controversy about music style and creative freedom, Benét changed to Reprise-distributed label Friday Records and recorded his next album, Hurricane. Thus Hurricane became his third released studio album on June 21, 2005 in the US. "I Wanna Be Loved" was the song that received the most airplay. The single reached number two on the Urban Adult Contemporary chart.

His fourth album Love & Life was released on September 9, 2008. It debuted at number eleven on the Billboard 200 and number two on the Top R&B/Hip-Hop Albums chart, making this his own highest peak position since A Day in the Life in 1999. The first single "You're the Only One" is also his first top 20 hit on the R&B chart in two years.

Lost in Time was Benét's fifth studio album which was released in the US on November 30, 2010. The first single "Sometimes I Cry" reached number one on the Hot Adult R&B Songs Chart. With its musical direction representing Benét's homage to the sweet soul sound of the early to mid-1970s, the album featured duets with Faith Evans; Chrisette Michelle; Ledisi; and Eddie Levert of The O'Jays.

On June 5, 2012, Eric Benét then released his latest album The One. It was the first album released on Benét's newly formed record label Jordan House Records, which he created in partnership with EMI. "Real Love" was the first single off The One and was the No. 1 added song to Urban AC when shipped to radio in October 2011.

In 2013, Eric Benét's 6th studio album, The One, won him the SoulTracks Readers' Choice Award for Best Male Vocalist. The One delivered 3 big hit tracks including 'Runnin,'  'Real Love,' and 'Harriett Jones.'

In April 2014, Benét signed R&B singer-songwriter Calvin Richardson and Goapele to his imprint along with BMG/Primary Wave Music to release their upcoming albums in the US.

In 2014, Eric Benét released an international album, The Other One, teaming up with the European production collective, The Afropeans to revisit his 2012 album The One.

Later that year, he then released an album of classic cover songs, exclusively distributed in Japan, titled, From E to U, Vol. 1.

In April 2016, he announced a new single "Sunshine" set to premiere on May 13, ahead of his eighth studio album that was due in the fall.

On October 7, 2016, Benét released his eponymous seventh studio album and first major album release since 2012's "The One", the album featured guest appearances from Tamia, Arturo Sandoval and MC Lyte.

In 2020, during the COVID-19 pandemic Benet started an on demand powdered by Omnis titled Eric After Dark (stylized as Eric @fter Dark).

Acting 
Benét has also been active as an actor; he had a recurring role on For Your Love (1998–2002). He made his film debut alongside Mariah Carey in Glitter (2001). He has a recurring role on the MTV scripted show Kaya (2007) where he plays a music producer. Benét appeared on Half & Half, in which he portrayed Reece Wilcox in 2005.

His second feature film role Trinity Goodheart premiered at the American Black Film Festival on July 9, 2011, and premiered on GMC on August 20, 2011.

In Fall 2013, Eric Benét appeared on the second season of BET's hit television show, Real Husbands of Hollywood. Benét was a guest star alongside Kevin Hart, Bobby Brown, and Boris Kodjoe.

Personal life 
His eldest daughter India Brianne Jordan was born December 3, 1991, to his late partner Tami Stauff, who died in a car accident in 1993. He married actress Halle Berry in January 2001, but by early October 2003, they had separated, with the divorce finalized in January 2005.

On July 31, 2011, he married Toronto native Manuela Testolini, ex-wife of Prince. Their first child, a girl named Lucia Bella, was born on December 21, 2011 and their second daughter together, Amoura Luna, was born on July 13, 2014.

Discography

Albums
 True to Myself (1996)
 A Day in the Life (1999)
 Hurricane (2005)
 Love & Life (2008)
 Lost in Time (2010)
 The One (2012)
 From E to U: Volume 1 (2014)
 Eric Benét (2016)

Awards and nominations
Black Reel Awards

|-
|2002
|"Love Don't Love Me" (from The Brothers)
|Best Original or Adapted Song
|
|-
|2012
|Trinity Goodheart
|Best Actor: T.V. Movie/Cable
|
|}

Grammy Award

|-
|2000
|"Spend My Life with You" (with Tamia)
|Best R&B Performance by a Duo or Group with Vocals
|
|-
|rowspan="2"|2009
|"You're the Only One"
|Best Male R&B Vocal Performance
|
|-
|Love & Life
|Best R&B Album
|
|-
|2012
|"Sometimes I Cry"
|Best Traditional R&B Performance
|
|}

NAACP Image Award

|-
|1997
|rowspan="2"|Eric Benét
|Outstanding New Artist
|
|-
|rowspan="3"|2000
|Outstanding Male Artist
|
|-
|"Spend My Life with You" (with Tamia)
|Outstanding Song
|
|-
|A Day in the Life
|Outstanding Album
|
|-
|rowspan="2"|2001
|Eric Benét
|Outstanding Male Artist
|
|-
|"When You Think of Me" (Directed by Prentice Smith)
|Outstanding Music Video
|
|}

References

External links

 Back To The Future: The Making Of Lost In Time with Eric Benét & George Nash Jr Interview at Soul Jones
 The Definitive Eric Benet, music and interview with JM Part1
 The Definitive Eric Benet, music and interview with JM Part2
 The Definitive Eric Benet, music and interview with JM Part3
 The Definitive Eric Benet, music and interview with JM Part4
 Eric Benét 2012 Audio Interview at Soulinterviews.com

1966 births
Living people
20th-century African-American male singers
American contemporary R&B singers
Musicians from Milwaukee
American neo soul singers
Warner Records artists
American male singer-songwriters
Ballad musicians
African-American songwriters
21st-century African-American male singers
Singer-songwriters from Wisconsin